Nigeria competed at the 1968 Summer Olympics in Mexico City, Mexico.

Results by event

Boxing
Men's Light Flyweight (– 48 kg)
Gabriel Ogun
 First Round — Bye
 Second Round — Defeated Stefan Alexandrov (BUL), 4:1 
 Quarterfinals — Lost to Harlan Marbley (USA), 0:5

Men's Light Heavyweight (– 81 kg)
Fatai Ayinla
 First Round — Bye
 Second Round — Defeated Enrique Villarreal (MEX), referee stopped contest
 Quarterfinals — Lost to Ion Monea (ROU), 2:3

Football
Group B

References

Official Olympic Reports

Nations at the 1968 Summer Olympics
1968
1968 in Nigeria
1968 in Nigerian sport